The year 2017 is the 1st year in the history of the World Lethwei Championship, a Lethwei promotion based in Myanmar.

List of events

WLC 1: The Great Beginning 

WLC 1: The Great Beginning was the inaugural Lethwei event organized by World Lethwei Championship and took place on March 3, 2017 at the Mingalardon Event Zone in Yangon, Myanmar.

Background 
The first WLC event was highly anticipated by the Lethwei fans around the world and took place on re-purposed driving range of the Mingalardon Country Club which was specially built for the event. The weigh-ins for the event were held in Kandawgyi Park in Yangon.

After losing his title to Dave Leduc in December 2016, Lethwei superstar Tun Tun Min returned to face British kickboxer Nicholas Carter in the main event. Tun Tun Min won the fight via brutal knockout in the first round. The co-main event featured Lethwei champion Too Too against Australian Muaythai fighter Eddie Farrell. Too Too won his fight by unanimous decision after he lacerated Farrel's face with punches  and opened up a huge gash on the his orbital bone.

Results

WLC 2: Ancient Warriors 

WLC 2: Ancient Warriors was a Lethwei event held on June 10, 2017 in Thuwunna Stadium in Yangon, Myanmar.

Background 
The main event featured a bout between top lethwei fighter Soe Lin Oo and Polish kickboxing champion Artur Saladiak. The co-main event featured Lethwei star Too Too against French Muaythai champion James Benal, France's top welterweight. Brent Bolsta was originally scheduled to compete at the event, but was involved in a motorcycle accident five days before the event. After 5 rounds, Too Too defeated Benal by decision and it was announced that he will be facing multiple-times Australian Muay Thai champion Michael Badato for the Middleweight World Lethwei Championship. Artur Saladiak outpointed Soe Lin Oo in the main event to earn a decision win, becoming the first foreign fighter to defeat Soe Lin Oo.

Results

WLC 3: Legendary Champions 

WLC 3: Legendary Champions was Lethwei event held on November 4, 2017 in Thuwunna Stadium in Yangon, Myanmar.

Background 
The main event featured Lethwei champion Too Too against Australian kickboxing champion Michael Badato. In the co-main event, Saw Nga Man defeated Eddie Farrell by unanimous decision. After a hard-fought five round battle, Too Too emerged victorious to claim the Middleweight World Lethwei Championship title. Umar Semata made his debut against veteran Soe Lin Oo and lost by knockout in the second round. ONE Championship Middleweight World Champion Aung La Nsang also made a special appearance at the event.

Results

See also
2017 in ILFJ

References

World Lethwei Championship events
2017 in Lethwei
2017 in kickboxing
2017 in Burmese sport